Smaragdus (Smaragdos) is a Latin masculine given name of ultimately Semitic origin, meaning "emerald". It may refer to:

Saint Smaragdus (d. c. 303), Roman Christian martyr, companion of Cyriacus
Saint Smaragdus (d. 320), one of the Forty Martyrs of Sebaste
Smaragdus (fl. 585–611), Byzantine administrator
Ardo Smaragdus (died 843), hagiographer
Smaragdus of Saint-Mihiel (d. c. 840), Benedictine monk